Diego García de Paredes y Vargas (1506, Trujillo, Spain – 1563, Catia, Province of Venezuela, Spanish Empire) was a maestre de campo and a Spanish conquistador who participated in, among other things, the Battle of Cajamarca. He also founded Trujillo, Venezuela in 1557.

Biography 

Diego García de Paredes was born in Trujillo and was the son of Diego García de Paredes “the Samson of Extremadura”, who fought in the Italian Wars and the war of Navarre, and Mencía de Vargas.

When he turned 18 he left for the New World and arrived in Nicaragua, where he would help conquer those territories under Gil González Dávila and Hernando de Soto. In 1530 he would move to Panama where he joined the Francisco Pizarro expedition as one of the one hundred and sixty men marching to the heart of the Inca Empire with the firm objective of conquering it. Paredes took part in the Battle of Cajamarca, in which they captured Atahualpa, effectively conquering the whole territory.

In 1534 he returned to Spain and later participated in wars in Flanders, France, Tunisia and Sicily, obtaining the rank of captain. After that, he returned to Trujillo.

Bored of life in Spain, Paredes returns to the New World in 1544 and participates in Francisco de Orellana’s second expedition to the Amazon. The expedition was a failure, losing fifty seven men due to hunger and seventeen because of attacks by the natives. He was one of the few who survived, and went to New Granada after the expedition to conquer those territories. 
After that, he moved to Venezuela and participates in the founding of Barquisimeto and Trujillo. Some time later Juan Rodríguez Suarez went to Trujillo while running away from Juan de Maldonado after escaping of the prison of Santa Fe. They refused to turn him over, and that action became the first example of political asylum in the Americas.
In 1561 Lope de Aguirre led his Maranones Rebellion across Venezuela, and Paredes was sent to fight him. He engaged Aguirre's forces at Barquisimeto, and Aguirre was ultimately killed by his one of his men, Custodio Hernandez. Lope de Aguirre was then judged post mortem and found guilty of lèse-majesté.

In 1562 he returned to Spain to ask compensation for the services given to the crown and the king Philip II named him as governor of Popayán. When the ship arrived at the coast of Venezuela Paredes landed with five soldiers to ask about his friend Luis de Narváez, who he didn't know had been killed some time before. While they were dining with the natives suddenly they lifted Narvaez's head and killed García de Paredes and the five soldiers accompanying him. The ones who remained in the boat had to leave them there because there was nothing they could do. According to Pedro Simón, this fact happened in Catia la Mar in January 1563.

References

1506 births
1563 deaths
Extremaduran conquistadors
People from Tierra de Trujillo